Bentivoglio (Northern Bolognese:  or ) is a comune (municipality) in the Metropolitan City of Bologna in the Italian region of Emilia-Romagna, located about  northeast of Bologna.

Bentivoglio borders the following municipalities: Argelato, Castel Maggiore, Granarolo dell'Emilia, Malalbergo, Minerbio, San Giorgio di Piano, San Pietro in Casale.

History

First settlements in Bentivoglio's territory date back to the Villanovan civilization, as testified by some cremation tombs dating from the 10th century BC and by a 6th-century BC stele. The Romans carried first measures for land reclamation.

In the Middle Ages the central area of the territory was called "Poledrano Bridge"; the name stemmed from the passage of foals on the Navile canal bridge.

Main sights
Museo della civiltà contadina at Villa Smeraldi.
San Martino di Castagnolo Minore

References

External links

 Official website

Cities and towns in Emilia-Romagna
Villanovan culture